The adjective pubescent may describe:
 people or animals undergoing puberty
 plants that are hairy, covered in trichomes
 insects that are covered in setae